Leptochoriolaus opacus is a species of beetle in the family Cerambycidae, the only species in the genus Leptochoriolaus.

References

Lepturinae